Qareh Zeki (also Romanized as Qareh Zekī; also known as Qarah Zāker) is a village in Anguran Rural District, Anguran District, Mahneshan County, Zanjan Province, Iran. At the 2006 census, its population was 131, in 30 families.

References 

Populated places in Mahneshan County